The 2020 BNP Paribas de Nouvelle-Calédonie was a professional tennis tournament played on hard courts. It was the seventeenth edition of the tournament which was part of the 2020 ATP Challenger Tour. It took place in Nouméa, New Caledonia between 6 and 12 January 2020.

Singles main-draw entrants

Seeds

 1 Rankings are as of 30 December 2019.

Other entrants
The following players received wildcards into the singles main draw:
  Hugo Gaston
  Harold Mayot
  Alexandre Müller
  Holger Vitus Nødskov Rune
  Colin Sinclair

The following players received entry into the singles main draw using protected rankings:
  Blaž Kavčič
  Maximilian Marterer

The following player received entry into the singles main draw as an alternate:
  Zdeněk Kolář

The following players received entry from the qualifying draw:
  Thai-Son Kwiatkowski
  Nam Ji-sung

Champions

Singles

 J. J. Wolf def.  Yūichi Sugita 6–2, 6–2.

Doubles

 Andrea Pellegrino /  Mario Vilella Martínez def.  Luca Margaroli /  Andrea Vavassori 7–6(7–1), 3–6, [12–10].

References

2020 ATP Challenger Tour
2020
2020 in New Caledonian sport
January 2020 sports events in Oceania
2020 in French tennis